Michael J. Sughrue (1857–1926) was an American attorney who served as District Attorney of Suffolk County, Massachusetts in 1905.

Early life
Sughrue was born on August 27, 1857, in Nashua, New Hampshire. During his youth, his family moved to Charlestown and attended Boston Public Schools. He returned to Nashua to attend Crosby Academy and in 1888 he graduated from the Boston University School of Law. On June 22, 1891, he married Elizabeth F. Quinn of Boston. They had four sons and five daughters.

Legal career

District attorney
In 1891, Sughrue became an assistant district attorney under Oliver Stevens. He also worked as a librarian at the Social Law Library. On August 2, 1905, Stevens resigned and Governor William Lewis Douglas appointed Sughrue to succeed him. The Massachusetts Governor's Council suspended its rules and immediately confirmed Sughrue. He ran for a full term in 1906 and won both the Democratic and Republican nominations. However he lost to Independent candidate John B. Moran by 4,349 votes.

Private practice
Following his defeat, Sughrue became legal counsel for the Boston Elevated Railway. From 1907 to 1908 he was counsel for the Boston Finance Committee during its investigation into the purchase of supplies by the city. He left this position after he was appointed public administrator for Suffolk County by Governor Curtis Guild Jr.

Sughrue died on April 15, 1926, at his home in Boston.

References

1857 births
1926 deaths
District attorneys in Suffolk County, Massachusetts
Boston University School of Law alumni
People from Nashua, New Hampshire
Politicians from Boston
Massachusetts Democrats
Massachusetts Republicans
19th-century American lawyers
20th-century American lawyers